Abyssochrysos eburneus is a species of sea snail, a marine gastropod mollusk in the family Abyssochrysidae.

Distribution
Found off west Africa.

References

External links

eburneus
Gastropods described in 1897